Alessandro Alessandrì (born 30 August 1979) is an Italian footballer who plays as a midfielder

Club career
Born in Galatina, Alessandro Alessandrì is from a near town, Martano, southern Apulia. He started his career at one of the northern giant Internazionale.

He left for clubs in Serie C1 and Serie C2 on loan, likes Castel di Sangro, Sanremese, Viareggio (along with Roman Miranda) and Tricase until 2001. He then played at semi-professional level for Serie D side Brindisi and Nardò until settled at Lamezia where he won Serie D runner-up and promotion playoffs. He played 126 league appearances and scored 26 goals before left for league rival Cisco Roma. In 2008, he was signed by league rival Gela and in 2009 by Apulia team Brindisi.

After Brindisi relegated, he joined Serie D club Isernia. In December, he left for Pomigliano.

References

External links 
 Profile at Football.it 
 Profile at FIGC 

Italian footballers
Inter Milan players
S.S.D. Sanremese Calcio players
F.C. Esperia Viareggio players
S.S.D. Città di Brindisi players
Vigor Lamezia players
Atletico Roma F.C. players
S.S.D. Città di Gela players
Association football forwards
Association football midfielders
Sportspeople from the Province of Lecce
1979 births
Living people
Footballers from Apulia
21st-century Italian people